This is list of archives in Italy.

Archives in Italy 
Vatican Archive (Italy)
Comune Archives (Italy)
Library Archives (Italy)
Cathedral Archives (Italy)
History of the Homeland Archives (Italy)
Diocesan Archives (Italy)
Central Archives of the State (Italy)
 
 List of State Archives of Italy
Audiovisual Archive of the Democratic and Labour Movement

See also 

 
 List of archives
 List of libraries in Italy
 List of museums in Italy
 Culture of Italy
 Open access in Italy
 Tabularium

Further reading

External links 

 ArchivesWiki Category:Italy

 
Archives
Italy
archives